H. M. Green was a member of the Minnesota House of Representatives.

Biography
Green was born in Dodge County, Wisconsin in 1851. He moved to Milwaukee, Wisconsin in 1890 and to Blue Earth County, Minnesota in 1906.

Career
Green was a member of the House of Representatives from 1917 to 1920. Previously, he was active in local politics in Milwaukee.

References

People from Dodge County, Wisconsin
Politicians from Milwaukee
People from Blue Earth County, Minnesota
Members of the Minnesota House of Representatives
1851 births
Year of death missing